The British Social Attitudes Survey (BSA) is an annual statistical survey conducted in Great Britain by National Centre for Social Research since 1983. The BSA involves in-depth interviews with over 3,300 respondents, selected using random probability sampling, focused on topics including newspaper readership, political parties and trust, public expenditure, welfare benefits, health care, childcare, poverty, the labour market and the workplace, education, charitable giving, the countryside, transport and the environment, the European Union, economic prospects, race, religion, civil liberties, immigration, sentencing and prisons, fear of crime and the portrayal of sex and violence in the media.
The survey is funded by the Gatsby Charitable Foundation, government departments, quasi-governmental bodies and other grant-giving organisations. The BSA was not conducted in 1988 and 1992, when funding was devoted instead to studies of voting behaviour and political attitudes in the British Election Study.  The King’s Fund and Nuffield Trust stepped in when the government stopped funding the poll.

Findings

Abortion 

The proportion of people who believe abortion should be allowed if a woman does not want a child has increased gradually during the period 1983-2016, from 40% in 1983 to 72% in 2016. Similarly an increasing number of people believe abortion should be allowed if a couple cannot afford a child, which reached a high of 68% in 2016. Over 90% of people have consistently believed that abortion is acceptable if the pregnancy is a result of rape.

Capital punishment 

Support for the death penalty has gradually decreased from 75% in 1986 to 43% in 2019. From 2014 onwards, less than half of people supported the use of capital punishment.

Economic inequality

Income redistribution

Wealth distribution

LGBT Rights

Same-sex relationships 

17% of people believed same-sex relationships were 'not wrong at all' in 1983 and the proportion of people holding this view reached a low of 11% in 1987 during the height of the AIDS pandemic. An increasing number of people were comfortable with same-sex relationships during the period 1989-2017 and as of 2018 66% of people do not consider same-sex relationships to be 'wrong at all'.

Transgender rights 
Attitudes towards transgender people were first examined in the 2016 report, which found that 49% of people view prejudice against transgender people as 'always wrong', compared with 6% who believe it is 'rarely or never wrong'. 34% of people believed prejudice against transgender people is only 'mostly' or 'sometimes' wrong.

Social security 

From 1983 until the late 1990s, most people thought that benefits for the unemployed were too low and caused hardship. Following the election of the Labour government in 1997, there was a sharp decline in this view and the majority of people now believed that unemployment benefit was too high until 2016, when an increasing number of people began to consider unemployment benefits as too low and the proportion of people holding this view reached a twenty five year high of 51% in 2020.

See also
Scottish Social Attitudes Survey

References

External links
British Social Attitudes Survey
British Social Attitudes Survey data
UK Data Service list of Key Data

Society of the United Kingdom
Social statistics data
1983 establishments in the United Kingdom
Recurring events established in 1983
Annual events in the United Kingdom
Surveys (human research)